The Arctic ringlet or Disa alpine (Erebia disa) is a member of the subfamily Satyrinae of family Nymphalidae. It is associated with wet muskeg and bogs in subarctic and Arctic climates, and is often found near the tree-line. The larva overwinters twice before undergoing metamorphosis into an adult. It is found in Arctic Europe, Arctic European Russia (Kanin Peninsula), Sajan, Irkutsk, Yakutsk, Yablonoi and Arctic North America.

Description
The upperside of the wings are dark brown with a fine black and white hashed line along the hind margins. The forewing has a red or orange strip fairly near the edge on which are four black blotches with white-centred eyespots. The hindwing is plain brown. The underside of the forewing is similar to the upperside while the underside of the hindwing is greyish brown with a broad dark brown lateral band and a hashed black and white margin. Species with which this butterfly could be confused include the Lapland ringlet (Erebia embla) and the Arran brown (Erebia ligea), but these both have white markings on the undersides of their hindwings.

Distribution and habitat
The Arctic ringlet has a Holarctic distribution. It is found in Arctic Europe, Arctic European Russia (Kanin Peninsula), Sajan, Irkutsk, Yakutsk, Yablonoi and Arctic North America. Its typical habitat is bogs and damp forests.

Life cycle
The food plants of the larvae are various species of grasses (Poaceae), cottongrasses (Eriophorum) and sedges (Carex). The larva overwinters twice as a caterpillar and the adult generally flies in July.

References

Bolotov I.N. 2012. The Fauna and Ecology of Butterflies (Lepidoptera, Rhopalocera) of the Kanin Peninsula and Kolguev Island. - Entomological Review 92(3): 296-304. DOI 10.1134/S0013873812030062

External links
CBIF Disa Alpine Canadian site

Erebia
Insects of the Arctic
Butterflies of Europe
Butterflies of Asia
Butterflies of North America
Butterflies described in 1791
Taxa named by Carl Peter Thunberg